This timeline is a chronology of significant events in the history of the U.S. State of Wyoming and the historical area now occupied by the state.


2020s

2010s

2000s

1990s

1980s

1970s

1960s

1950s

1940s

1930s

1920s

1910s

1900s

1890s

1880s

1870s

1860s

1850s

1840s

1830s

1820s

1810s

1800s

1790s

1780s

1770s

1760s

1690s

1680s

1590s

1540s

1510s

1490s

Before 1492

See also

History of Wyoming
Bibliography of Wyoming history
Bibliography of Yellowstone National Park
Emigrant Trail in Wyoming
List of counties in Wyoming
List of ghost towns in Wyoming
List of governors of Wyoming
List of municipalities in Wyoming
Outline of Wyoming
Outline of Wyoming territorial evolution
Territory of Wyoming
State of Wyoming
Timeline of Wyoming history
Timeline of Cheyenne, Wyoming

References
References are included in the linked articles.

External links

State of Wyoming website
Wyoming State Historical Society website

Timeline of Wyoming history
Timelines of states of the United States
United States history timelines
Timeline of Wyoming history